Dame Louise Margaret Leila Wemyss, Lady Paget, GBE (born 9 October 1881 – died 24 September 1958) was a British humanitarian, active in the cause of Serbian relief, beginning in World War I.

Family
The daughter of General Sir Arthur Henry Fitzroy Paget (1851–1928) and his wife, Mary Fiske Paget (née Stevens; died 1919), she married her third cousin once removed, Sir Ralph Spencer Paget, son of Sir Augustus Berkeley Paget and Countess Walburga Ehrengarde Helena von Hohenthal, on 28 October 1907; the union was childless.

Philanthropic work

Ralph Spencer Paget was appointed Knight Commander of the Order of St Michael and St George (KCMG) in 1909 and Louise encouraged him to accept a transfer to the Balkan Kingdom of Serbia in July 1910. Encouraged by Mabel Grujić, the American wife of the Serbian Undersecretary for Foreign Affairs, Lady Paget helped set up a military hospital in Belgrade during the First Balkan War (1912–13). In 1914, Paget became the president of the American Women's War Relief Fund. The group, dedicated to helping those hurt in the war, was conceived of as an idea by Paget only three days after the First World War broke out. In 1915 she set up a hospital in Skopje to treat wounded Serbs, but also to help fight the epidemic spreading through Serbia. Lady Paget contracted typhoid fever, but recovered. Paget also helped raise money to support the needs of wounded servicemembers.

Dame Louise Paget was the first recipient of the Medal of Honor of the Federation of Women's Clubs of New York City in 1917; other  recipients included humanitarian Evelyn Smalley (1919), activist Carrie Chapman Catt (1922, decoration without the eagle), physicist Marie Curie (1929), Madame Chiang Kai-shek, First Lady of the Republic of China (1939), and Austrian-born pioneer atomic scientist Lise Meitner (1949).

Honours
Louise, Lady Paget was invested as a Dame Grand Cross, Order of the British Empire (GBE) in 1917. She was later decorated with the Grand Cordon, Order of St Sava.

Death
She died on 24 September 1958, aged 76, at Kingston-upon-Thames.

Citations
Charles Mosley, editor, Burke's Peerage and Baronetage, 106th edition, 2 volumes (Crans, Switzerland: Burke's Peerage (Genealogical Books) Ltd, 1999), volume 1, pp. 73, 77.

See also
 People on Scottish banknotes
Elsie Inglis Memorial Maternity Hospital
Scottish Women's Hospitals for Foreign Service
 Eveline Haverfield
 Elizabeth Ness MacBean Ross
 Elsie Inglis
 Mabel St Clair Stobart
 Josephine Bedford
 Katherine Harley
 Isabel Emslie Hutton

References

1881 births
1958 deaths
British humanitarians
Dames Grand Cross of the Order of the British Empire
Grand Crosses of the Order of St. Sava
Louise
Nurses from London
Place of death missing
Wives of knights